Across the Broad Atlantic is the eighth album by Irish folk and rebel band The Wolfe Tones. The album features songs about Irish emigration to the United States.

Track list 
 The Rambling Irishman
 Paddy on the Railway
 The Great Hunger
 Many Young Men of Twenty
 Sweet Tralee
 Shores of America
 A Dream of Liberty
 Paddy's Green Shamrock Shore
 Goodbye Mick
 Spancil Hill
 The Fighting 69th
 The Boston Burglar
 Farewell to Dublin

The Wolfe Tones albums
1976 albums